The Australian mottled moray (in Australia), and mottled moray (in New Zealand), Gymnothorax prionodon, is a moray eel of the family Muraenidae, found at depths down to 80 m.  Their length is between 80 and 150 cm.

References

 
 
 Tony Ayling & Geoffrey Cox, Collins Guide to the Sea Fishes of New Zealand,  (William Collins Publishers Ltd, Auckland, New Zealand 1982) 

prionodon
Fish described in 1895